In psychology, the principal laws of association are contiguity, repetition, attention, pleasure-pain, and similarity.  The basic laws were formulated by Aristotle in approximately 300 B.C. and by John Locke in the seventeenth century.  Both philosophers taught that the mind at birth is a blank slate and that all knowledge has to be acquired by learning.  The laws they taught still make up the backbone of modern learning theory.

References 

Laws of Association - Dictionary of Cognitive Science - Dr. Michael R.W. Dawson and Dr. David A. Medler. Retrieved 8 March 2012.

Cognitive science